The Barbados women's national football team is the national women's football team of Barbados and is overseen by the Barbados Football Association. It has never qualified for a major international tournament.

Team image

Home stadium
The Barbados women's national team play their home matches on the Barbados National Stadium.

Results and fixtures

The following is a list of match results in the last 12 months, as well as any future matches that have been scheduled.

Legend

2022

Coaching staff

Current coaching staff

Players

Current squad
The following players were named for the match against Belize on 12 April 2022.

Caps and goals accurate up to and including 18 October 2021.

Recent call-ups
The following players have been called up to the squad in the past 12 months.

Records

*Active players in bold, statistics correct as of 18 October 2021.

Most capped players

Top goalscorers

Competitive record
FIFA Women's World Cup*Draws include knockout matches decided on penalty kicks.Olympic Games*Draws include knockout matches decided on penalty kicks.CONCACAF W Championship*Draws include knockout matches decided on penalty kicks.CFU Women's Caribbean Cup*Draws include knockout matches decided on penalty kicks.''

See also
Barbados men's national football team
Barbados Football Association
Sport in Barbados

References

External links
Official website
FIFA Profile